Fusion Camera System (a.k.a. Reality Camera System 1) is a digital movie camera system developed by James Cameron and Vince Pace. It was developed as a way to shoot features in stereoscopic 3-D. The Fusion Camera System made first use of Sony HDC-F950 and later of Sony HDC-1500 HD cameras when they became available. The cameras are equipped with Fujinon lenses from Fujifilm.

Films that used the Fusion Camera System

References

Film and video technology
 
3D imaging
James Cameron